Hyalurga uria is a moth of the family Erebidae. It was described by Arthur Gardiner Butler in 1871. It is found in Peru, Panama and the Amazon region.

References

 Arctiidae genus list at Butterflies and Moths of the World of the Natural History Museum

Hyalurga
Moths described in 1871